Journey to the Land of the Traveller (Safari be diār-e mosāfer) is a 1993 Iranian documentary film directed by Bahman Kiarostami.

See also
List of Iranian films

References

External links

Iranian documentary films
1993 films
1990s Persian-language films